Kennedy Middle School or John F. Kennedy Middle School may refer to any of a number of middle schools, including:

Kennedy Middle School (Atlanta, Georgia)
Kennedy Middle School (Cupertino, California)
Kennedy Middle School (Germantown, Wisconsin)
Kennedy Middle School (Natick, Massachusetts)
Kennedy Middle School (Redwood City, California)
Kennedy Middle School (Rockford, Illinois), in Rockford, Illinois
Kennedy Middle School (Winston-Salem, North Carolina)
John F. Kennedy Catholic School (Washington, Pennsylvania), in Washington, Pennsylvania
John F. Kennedy Middle School (North Miami Beach, Florida)
John F. Kennedy Middle School (Northampton, Massachusetts)
John F. Kennedy Middle School (Southington, Connecticut)
John F. Kennedy Middle School (St. Clair Shores, Michigan)
John F. Kennedy Middle School (Enfield, Connecticut)
John F. Kennedy Middle School (Suffolk, Virginia)

See also
John F. Kennedy Junior High School
John F. Kennedy School, Berlin
Kennedy Junior High School
Kennedy Metro Middle School